Fityk is curve fitting and data analysis application, predominantly used to fit analytical,
bell-shaped functions to experimental data. It is positioned to fill the gap between general plotting software and programs specific for one field, e.g. crystallography or XPS.

Originally, Fityk was developed to analyse powder diffraction data. It is also used in other fields that require peak analysis and peak-fitting, like chromatography or various kinds of spectroscopy.

Fityk is free and open source, distributed under the terms of GNU General Public License, with binaries/installers available free of charge on the project's website. It runs on Linux, macOS, Microsoft Windows, FreeBSD and other platforms. It operates either as a command line program or with a graphical user interface.

It is written in C++, using wxWidgets, and providing bindings for Python and other scripting languages.

Features
 three weighted least squares methods:
Levenberg-Marquardt algorithm,
Nelder-Mead method
Genetic algorithm
 about 20 built-in functions and support for user-defined functions
 equality constraints
 data manipulations,
 handling series of datasets,
 automation of common tasks with scripts.

Alternatives
The programs LabPlot, MagicPlot and peak-o-mat have similar scope.

More generic data analysis programs with spread-sheet capabilities include the proprietary Origin and its clones QtiPlot (paid, closed source) and SciDAVis (non-paid, open source).

See also

Comparison of numerical analysis software

External links

References 

2004 software
Data analysis software
Free plotting software
Free science software
Free software programmed in C++
Free software projects
Regression and curve fitting software
Software that uses wxWidgets